National Highway 206 commonly referred to as NH 206, is a highway in the Indian state Meghalaya. Starting from Jowai near NH 106, it goes via Dawki and ends at Mylliem. It is also a part of Shillong-Sylhet road. It is a spur of National Highway 6.

See also
 List of National Highways in India by highway number
 National Highways Development Project

References

External links
NH 206 on OpenStreetMap

AH1
National highways in India
Transport in Shillong
National Highways in Meghalaya